This is a list of Dutch television related events from 2007.

Events
24 February - Sharon Kips wins the first series of X Factor.
26 May - RTL weathergirl Helga van Leur and her partner Marcus van Teijlingen win the third series of Dancing with the Stars.

Debuts

Television shows

1950s
NOS Journaal (1956–present)

1970s
Sesamstraat (1976–present)

1980s
Jeugdjournaal (1981–present)
Het Klokhuis (1988–present)

1990s
Goede tijden, slechte tijden (1990–present)
De Club van Sinterklaas (1999-2009)

2000s
Idols (2002-2008, 2016–present)
Dancing with the Stars (2005-2009)
X Factor (2006–present)

Ending this year

Births

Deaths

See also
2007 in the Netherlands